Blehr's Second Cabinet was the government of Norway between 22 June 1921 and 6 March 1923. It was a Liberal Party cabinet led by Prime Minister Otto Blehr, who also served as Minister of Finance. The cabinet handed in its resignation on 2 March 1923, which was accepted and taken into effect four days later. The reason was that there was a majority against its proposal to increase wine and spirit imports from Spain and Portugal.

Cabinet members

|}

References

Norwegian politicians
Cabinet of Norway
1921 establishments in Norway
1923 disestablishments in Norway
Cabinets established in 1921
Cabinets disestablished in 1923